Arron Spiessberger-Parker (born 13 January 1996) is an Australian middle-distance runner. He was the 2015 National champion for the 5000m at the 2015 Australian Junior Athletics Championships.

Biography
Parker grew up in Nowra, and his first athletics club was Nowra Athletics club

References

1996 births
Living people
Australian male middle-distance runners
People from Nowra
Sportsmen from New South Wales